The Boeing B-1 (company designation Model 6) was a small biplane flying boat designed by William Boeing shortly after World War I.

Design and development
The Model 6 was the first commercial design for Boeing (as opposed to military or experimental designs), hence the B-1 designation.  Its layout was conventional for its day, with a Hall-Scott engine driving a pusher propeller mounted amongst the cabane struts. The pilot sat in an open cockpit at the bow, and up to two passengers could be carried in a second open cockpit behind the first. The design was reminiscent of the Curtiss HS-2L that Boeing had been building under license during the war.

Operational history
Only a single aircraft was built, as Boeing had trouble selling it in a market flooded with war-surplus aircraft. In 1920, it was purchased by Edward Hubbard, who used it to carry air mail between Seattle, Washington and Victoria, British Columbia. Air mail service began on 27 December 1919, and continued for eight years. The plane flew until 1930 before being preserved and put on display at Seattle's Museum of History and Industry in 1954.

Specifications

References

 Bowers, Peter M. Boeing aircraft since 1916. London: Putnam Aeronautical Books, 1989. .

External links

 Boeing history - B-1
 Hubbard: The Forgotten Boeing Aviator

1910s United States civil utility aircraft
Flying boats
006, Boeing
Single-engined pusher aircraft
Biplanes
Aircraft first flown in 1919